George Ternent Stephenson (3 September 1900 – 18 August 1971) was a professional manager at Huddersfield Town. His brother was the ex-Town player Clem Stephenson.

As a player, he spent the period from November 1919 to November 1927 with Aston Villa, before moving on to Derby County. After four seasons at Derby, he moved on to Sheffield Wednesday in 1931. He spent the 1933–34 season with Preston North End before spending the last three years of his career with Charlton Athletic where he retired in 1936.

He was also an England international, making two appearances in 1928, scoring twice against France on his debut on 17 May 1928. He made his third and final appearance for England on 14 May 1931.

His son Bob was also a professional footballer, playing for Derby County, Shrewsbury Town and Rochdale in the 1960s, as well as playing cricket for Derbyshire and Hampshire between 1967 and 1980.

References

 For infobox stats:

External links
Aston Villa profile at Aston Villa Player Database
England career details

1900 births
1971 deaths
People from Blyth, Northumberland
English footballers
England international footballers
Association football inside forwards
Aston Villa F.C. players
Derby County F.C. players
Sheffield Wednesday F.C. players
Preston North End F.C. players
Charlton Athletic F.C. players
English football managers
Huddersfield Town A.F.C. managers
Footballers from Northumberland